Noemi Steuer was a Swiss actress (Basel, 15 January 1957 – 14 July 2020), notable for her role as Helga Aufschrey, in Edgar Reitz's film/TV series Die Zweite Heimat (1993).

Steuer was also an ethnologist, notable for her research of the impact of AIDS in Africa, especially in Mali.

Filmography 
 1992 ''Kinder der Landstrasse

External links
 
 Biography at the Zweite Heimat website
 Interview with Steuer regarding her research of AIDS in Africa (in German)

1957 births
2020 deaths
Swiss film actresses
Swiss television actresses
Actors from Basel-Stadt